Fiddler's Green is an after-life where there is perpetual mirth, a fiddle that never stops playing, and dancers who never tire.
In 19th-century English maritime folklore, it was a kind of after-life for sailors who had served at least fifty years at sea.

In literature
Fiddler's Green appears in Frederick Marryat's novel The Dog Fiend; Or, Snarleyyow, published in 1856, as lyrics to a sailors' song:

Herman Melville describes a Fiddler's Green as a sailors' term for the place on land "providentially set apart for dance-houses, doxies, and tapsters" in his posthumous novella Billy Budd, Sailor.

Fiddler's Green is the title of a 1950 novel by Ernest K. Gann, about a fugitive criminal who works as a seaman after stowing away.

The author Richard McKenna wrote a story, first published in 1967, titled "Fiddler's Green,” in which he considers the power of the mind to create a reality of its own choosing, especially when a number of people consent to it. The main characters in this story are also sailors, and have known of the legend of Fiddler's Green for many years.

Fiddler's Green is an extrasolar colony mentioned in Robert A. Heinlein's novels The Cat Who Walks Through Walls and Friday.

In Neil Gaiman's The Sandman comic book series, Fiddler's Green is a place located inside of the Dreaming, a place that sailors have dreamed of for centuries. Fiddler's Green is also personified as a character as well as a location in the fictional world, the former largely based upon casual associations of G. K. Chesterton. In the 2022 TV adaption of the books, the personification is played by Stephen Fry. From November 12 to 14, 2004, a comic book convention promoted as "Fiddler's Green, A Sandman Convention" was held at the Millennium Hotel in Minneapolis, Minnesota. Author Neil Gaiman and several Sandman series artists, and others involved in the series' publication, participated in the convention, with profits benefiting the Comic Book Legal Defense Fund.

In Patrick O'Brian's novel Post Captain, the character Jack Aubrey describes several seamen living together on land by saying, "We'll lay in beer and skittles – it will be Fiddler's Green!".

In music
 A song called "Fiddler's Green", or more often "Fo'c'sle Song", was written by John Conolly in 1966, a Lincolnshire songwriter. It has been recorded by Tim Hart and Maddy Prior for their album Folk Songs of Olde England Vol. 2 (1968), by The Dubliners for their album Plain and Simple (1973), and by The Irish Rovers for their album Upon a Shamrock Shore: Songs of Ireland & the Irish (2000). The American sailor band Schooner Fare credits the song for bringing together their band. The song is sung worldwide in nautical and Irish traditional circles, and is often mistakenly thought to be a traditional song.
 "Fiddler's Green" is a song from the album Road Apples by Canadian rock group The Tragically Hip, written for lead singer Gord Downie's young nephew Charles Gillespie, who died before the album was released. The track was covered by Welsh band Stereophonics on their 1999 Deluxe album Performance and Cocktails
 "Fiddler's Green" is a song from Marley's Ghost's album Four Spacious Guys (1996).
 Fiddler's Green is the title track and name of Tim O'Brien's Grammy Award-winning 2005 album.
 Fiddler's Green is a German folk-rock band, formed in 1990.
 "Fiddler on the Green" is a song by German-American power metal supergroup Demons & Wizards, from their self-titled album released in 1999.
 Fiddler's Green is mentioned in the Archie Fisher song "The Final Trawl" from the album Windward Away, about fishermen whose livelihoods are passing away.
 Fiddler's Green is also mentioned in the extended version of the song "Hoist the Colors" from the Pirates of the Caribbean films.
 Friends of Fiddler's Green is a folk music group form Canada, founded in 1971.
 Fiddler's Green is an outdoor amphitheatre in Greenwood Village, Colorado.

In art

 Statue by Ray Lonsdale, installed in 2017 on Fish Quay in North Shields, England.

In the United States military

The Cavalrymen's Poem, also entitled "Fiddlers' Green" was published in the US Army's Cavalry Journal in 1923 and became associated with the 1st Cavalry Division.

Halfway down the trail to Hell in a shady meadow green,
are the Souls of all dead troopers camped near a good old-time canteen,
and this eternal resting place is known as Fiddlers' Green.

Marching past, straight through to Hell, the Infantry are seen, 
accompanied by the Engineers, Artillery and Marine,
for none but the shades of Cavalrymen dismount at Fiddlers' Green.

Though some go curving down the trail to seek a warmer scene,
no trooper ever gets to Hell ere he's emptied his canteen 
and so rides back to drink again with friends at Fiddlers' Green.
 
And so when man and horse go down beneath a saber keen,
or in a roaring charge fierce melee you stop a bullet clean,
and the hostiles come to get your scalp,
just empty your canteen and put your pistol to your head
and go to Fiddlers' Green.

The name has had other military uses. Many places associated with the US military have been named Fiddler's Green:

 The US Marine Corps operated Firebase Fiddler's Green in the Helmand River Valley, in Helmand Province, Afghanistan.
 An artillery Fire Support Base in Military Region III in Vietnam in 1972, occupied principally by elements of 2nd Squadron, 11th Armored Cavalry
 The US Navy's enlisted men's club in Sasebo, Japan from 1952 to 1976
 The cavalryman's poem about Fiddler's Green is the regimental poem of the US 2nd Cavalry Regiment.
 The enlisted men's club at United States Naval Training Center Bainbridge
 An informal bar at the Fort Sill Officers' Open Mess
 The stable and pasture used by Parsons Mounted Cavalry, a cadet group at Texas A&M University in College Station, Texas
 A bar at the Saber & Quill in Fort Knox, Kentucky
 The larger of the two bars at the Leader's Club at Fort Benning, Georgia
 Building 2805 at Fort Hood Texas, the former officer's club
 A small enlisted club on the Marine Corps Base Camp Pendleton in California
 The base pub at the Joint Forces Training Base in Los Alamitos, California
 Former dining facility used by 2nd Cavalry Regiment at Fort Polk, Louisiana
 An artillery-only pub for the 10th Marine Regiment, Marine Corps Base Camp Lejeune in North Carolina
 A privately-owned restaurant in San Diego, California adjacent to Naval Base Point Loma and Marine Corps Recruit Depot San Diego

See also
 Big Rock Candy Mountain
 Cockaigne
 Order of the Spur
 Paradise
 Tír na nÓg
 Friends of Fiddler's Green

References

Further reading
 
 Fiddlers green – World Wide Words

Fictional regions
Fictional populated places
Heaven
Maritime folklore
Supernatural legends